Boekt is a village in Zolder that is part of the Heusden-Zolder municipality of the Limburg province in the Flemish Community of Belgium. The village has its own village council.

References

External links
Unofficial website (in Dutch)

Heusden-Zolder
Populated places in Limburg (Belgium)